A slottslän was an administrative division in Sweden and Finland (formerly part of Sweden) from late 13th century to 1634. The term slottslän can be translated as "castle fief". Although the word "län" literally means fief, in Sweden it is translated as "county" and in Finland as "province".

Slottsläns were established by Birger Jarl and King Magnus III of Sweden to replace the old Ledung system. It was replaced with the taxation of farming and agriculture. Taxes were paid to the castle or manor which was the administrative centre of the slottslän. The slottsläns were disbanded in 1634 following Axel Oxenstierna's land reform and replaced with counties.

Slottsläns in Sweden

Slottsläns in Finland

References 

Types of administrative division
Former subdivisions of Sweden
Former subdivisions of Finland